William Trotter may refer to:
 Bill Trotter (William Felix Trotter, 1908–1984), major league baseball pitcher
 William Monroe Trotter (1872–1934), American newspaper editor and civil rights activist
 William R. Trotter (1943–2018), American author and historian
 William T. Trotter, American mathematician
 William Trotter (cabinet-maker) (1772–1833), Scottish furniture maker and Lord Provost of Edinburgh, 1825–27

See also
 Willie Trotter (born 1959), English post-punk musician